Benjamin Acquah (born 29 December 2000) is a Ghanaian footballer who plays as a midfielder for Swedish club Helsingborgs IF. He previously played for Ghana Premier League side Cape Coast Ebusua Dwarfs.

Career 
Acquah started his career with Cape Coast Ebusua Dwarfs. In March 2021, he joined Helsingborgs IF on a one-year initial one-year loan deal with an option to make it permanent on a three-year contract.

References

External links 
 
 

Living people
People from Greater Accra Region
2000 births
Association football midfielders
Ghanaian footballers
Ebusua Dwarfs players
Helsingborgs IF players
Allsvenskan players
Superettan players
Ghanaian expatriate footballers
Expatriate footballers in Sweden
Ghanaian expatriate sportspeople in Sweden